The Meady White House is a historic house in Saltillo, Tennessee, U.S..

History
The house was built in 1847 by slaves for Meady White, who lived here with his family. White lost some of his slaves in 1858 due to a lawsuit; they were auctioned in Savannah. After the American Civil War of 1861–1865, White purchased land in Decatur County. By the 1880s, he was a "farmer, large landowner, tanyard owner, dry goods store owner, cotton mill owner, stave business owner, and a horse breeder." White lived in the house until his death in 1889. It was sold out of the White family in 1913.

Architectural significance
The house was designed in the Greek Revival and Italianate architectural styles. The ceilings were painted by John Joseph Christie in 1872–1877. It has been listed on the National Register of Historic Places since July 1, 1993.

References

National Register of Historic Places in Hardin County, Tennessee
Greek Revival architecture in Tennessee
Italianate architecture in Tennessee
Houses completed in 1847